Stephen Foster Folk Culture Center State Park is a Florida State Park located in White Springs off U.S. 41, along the Suwannee River in north Florida.

Stephen Foster is famous for having written the song "Old Folks At Home," also known as "Way Down Upon the Suwannee River." The song, referring  nostalgically to "home far, far away," is Florida's state song.

Stephen Foster Museum
The Stephen Foster Museum honors the accomplishments of American composer Stephen Foster and features dioramas and exhibits about his famous songs, including Old Folks at Home, more commonly known by the words of its first line as "(Way Down Upon the) Swanee River."

Honoring Foster, who never visited Florida, was the idea of Josiah K. Lilly, Sr., the son of Eli Lilly. He proposed the memorial in 1931.

Carillon
The carillon was originally constructed by J. C. Deagan, Inc. for the spire of the Florida exhibit building at the 1939 World's Fair. It had 75 bells, weighed 25 tons, and was the largest carillon in the world (by number of bells). It was a gift of Florida's Stephen Foster Memorial Association, who intended to place it at a new Foster memorial building in White Springs after the fair.

The installation in at the Stephen Foster Folk Culture Center State Park didn't occur until the summer of 1958; by which the bell count had increased to 97. More than a year was required by Deagan craftsmen to build the huge set of bells, perhaps the greatest single manufacturing project in the firm’s 78-year history.

The carillon plays Foster's songs throughout the day. A second museum area inside the tower also features exhibits about Stephen Foster and the carillon. The carillon was damaged by an electrical storm in 2017, repairs have begun to restore the bells.

Gallery

See also
 List of music museums

References

External links

 Stephen Foster Folk Culture Center State Park at Florida State Parks
 Photos of Stephen Foster Folk Culture Center State Park at Florida Parks
 Stephen Foster State Folk Culture Center at Absolutely Florida
 Stephen Foster State Folk Culture Center at Wildernet
Explore Southern History - Information on Stephen Foster Folk Culture Center State Park

Parks in Hamilton County, Florida
State parks of Florida
Museums in Hamilton County, Florida
Foster, Stephen
Music museums in Florida
Protected areas established in 1950
1950 establishments in Florida
Folk museums in the United States
Stephen Foster
Bell towers in the United States
Towers completed in 1957